Snitker is a surname of German origin. Notable people with the surname include:

Alexander Snitker (born 1975), American politician
Brian Snitker (born 1955), American baseball player, coach, and manager
Troy Snitker (born 1988), American baseball player and coach

References

Surnames of German origin